Trap House is the debut studio album by American rapper Gucci Mane. It was released on May 24, 2005, by Big Cat Records and Tommy Boy Records. Production was handled by Shawty Redd, Zaytoven, Nitti and The Heatmakerz. The album features guest appearances from Young Jeezy, Boo Rossini, Chamillionaire, Jody Breeze, Khujo, Killer Mike, Lil Scrappy, Mac Bre-Z, Torica and Young Snead.

The album was supported by five singles: "Icy" featuring Young Jeezy and Boo, "Go Head" featuring Mac Bree-Z, "Money Don't Matter" featuring Torica, "Trap House" and "That's All". All four of these singles received radio airplay, except for the fifth single.

Singles 
The commercial debut single, called "Icy" was released as the lead single from the album on April 13, 2005. The song features guest appearances from fellow American rapper Young Jeezy, and American hip hop recording artist Boo, with production by Zaytoven.

The album's second single, "Go Head" was released on July 5, 2005. The song features a guest appearance from a female rapper Mac Bree-Z, with production by Nitti. The single was also included on Gucci Mane's second album Hard to Kill (2006).

The album's third single, "Money Don't Matter" was released on September 13, 2005. The song features a guest appearance from female American recording artist Torica, with production by Nitti.

The album's title track, "Trap House" was released as the album's fourth single on November 22, 2005. The song was produced by Shawty Redd.

The album's fifth and final single, "That's All" was released on December 7, 2005. The song was produced by Nitti.

Commercial performance 
In the United States, Trap House debuted at number 101 on the Billboard 200. It also peaked at number 20 on the US Top R&B/Hip-Hop Albums, and at number five on the US Top Independent Albums charts. To date, the album sold 127,000 copies in the United States.

Track listing

Charts

References

External links

2005 debut albums
Gucci Mane albums
Albums produced by Zaytoven
Albums produced by Shawty Redd
Albums produced by the Heatmakerz